Unicorn Wars is a 2022 Spanish-French animated splatter war film written and directed by Alberto Vázquez. The plot is set against the backdrop of a conflict between anthropomorphized teddy bears and unicorns.

Plot 
In a magical forest, unicorns lived alongside wild animals. But the bears found a Sacred Book of knowledge in the ruins of a church. The book enabled the bears to gain sentience and form their own civilization. Over time, the bears physically evolved to a multi-colored "teddy bear" form. According to their beliefs, the bears wanted to cultivate the forest, but the unicorns opposed them. This led to a war between bears and unicorns. But the bears believe that the war will end when their "chosen one" drinks the blood of the last unicorn, and a godlike being will return to the forest.

Drill Sergeant Caricias trains a new troop of recruits that includes brothers Gordi and Azulín. A priest instills a religious doctrine of hatred for unicorns in the troops. Azulín pretends to protect Gordi, and aspires to be the best recruit, hoping to be Chosen One someday. But he grows resentful of the troop's top recruit, Coco. And he has felt jealous of his brother since their birth when Gordi came out first, gaining the favor of their mother. When their mother left their father for another man, Azulín's jealousy grew so vicious that he poured poison into his mother's lemonade, killing her.

The camp's leaders send the troops to the forest to find a missing squad, with Caricias and the Priest leading. In the forest, they find glowworms that they consider eating. The Priest warns that the scripture says not to eat them, but Caricias angrily defies the warning. The glowworms turn out to be hallucinogenic, and the troops see frightening hallucinations that cost the lives of two recruits. Later on, they find the mutilated remains of the squad members, presumably murdered by unicorns. Sergeant Caricias goes insane as a result. Soon after, they stumble upon one lone unicorn and kill her. But other unicorns appear and fight the recruits, leaving only Azulín, Gordi and Coco alive. Azulín's rage against Coco explodes, and he kills the wounded Coco and even cannibalizes him.

The brothers find two other unicorns. Azulín kills one of them and badly wounds the other, a filly named Maria. In trying to kill Maria, Azulín falls into a river, severely disfiguring the right side of his face in the fall. The river sweeps Azulín away, where another troop finds him. While Azulín recuperates in the hospital, the military leaders promote him to Lieutenant, and present him as a hero to inspire the soldiers. Back at the forest, Gordi takes pity on Maria and nurses her back to health. Before the fight, Maria had stumbled upon the church and found the building now occupied by simians.

Azulín grows so popular among the soldiers that he leads a coup, killing the military leaders. He then organizes the bear army for one final massive assault to destroy the forest. The unicorns then all unite to confront the bears. In the brutal final battle, all bears die except for the brothers, and all unicorns die except for Maria. Azuliín and Gordi reunite. But when Azulín sees Gordi helping Maria, his rage boils over and he kills both Gordi and Maria. He drinks Maria's blood to finally fulfill the prophesy. But Maria's body morphs into a formless monster that consumes Gordi's body and also Azulín. At last the monster morphs into the godlike creature foretold, a human being. The human leads the simians as the new rulers of the world.

Voice cast

Production 
Vázquez declared to have three main inspirations when writing: Apocalypse Now, Bambi and the Bible. The project was showcased in a 'Work in Progress' panel of the 45th Annecy International Animation Film Festival. A Spanish-French co-production by Abano Producións SL, Uniko Estudio Creativo S.L., Unicorn Wars AIE, Autour de Minuit, Productions SARL, and Schmuby Productions SAS, the film received funding from Eurimages.

Release 
The film was presented at the 46th Annecy International Animation Film Festival on 16 June 2022, as part of the festival's official competition. It made its US premiere at the Fantastic Fest. Distributed by Barton Films, the film was theatrically released in Spain on 21 October 2022. Charades handled the sales elsewhere. It was released in French theatres on 28 December 2022 by UFO Distribution. The film received a limited theatrical release in North America on 10 March 2023.

Reception 
On Rotten Tomatoes, the film has a 83% rating based on 29 reviews with an average rating of 7.00/10, with the critics' consensus reading "while its humor may strike some as needlessly crude, Unicorn Wars is a visually audacious strike against cultural and military fascism".

Accolades 

|-
| rowspan = "11" align = "center" | 2023
| 10th Feroz Awards || colspan = "2" | Arrebato Award (Fiction) ||  || align = "center" | 
|-
| 78th CEC Medals || colspan = "2" | Best Animated Film ||  || 
|-
| rowspan = "2 | 37th Goya Awards || colspan = "2" | Best Animated Film
| 
| rowspan = "2"  | 
|-
| Best Original Song || "Batalla" by Joseba Beristain || 
|-
| rowspan = "6" | 21st Mestre Mateo Awards || Best Director || Alberto Vázquez ||  || rowspan = "6" align = "center" | 
|-
| Best Screenplay || Alberto Vázquez || 
|-
| Best Art Direction || Alberto Vázquez || 
|-
| colspan = "2" | Best Animated Film || 
|-
| Best Editing || Íñigo Gómez, Estanis Bañuelos || 
|-
| Best Sound || Iñaki Alonso || 
|-
| 10th Platino Awards
| colspan="2"| Best Animated Film
| 
| rowspan="1"| 
|-
|}

See also 
 List of Spanish films of 2022
 List of French films of 2022
 The Last Unicorn - both the 1968 book and the 1982 film adaptation

References

External links 
Official website

2022 films
2022 animated films
2022 fantasy films
2020s French films
2020s Spanish films
2020s Spanish-language films
2020s war films
Spanish animated films
French adult animated films
French animated films
Spanish splatter films
French fantasy films
Spanish war films
French war films
Spanish fantasy films
French splatter films
Adult animated films
Animated films about siblings
Animated war films
Films about prejudice
Films about toys
Films about unicorns
Sentient toys in fiction
Anti-war films
2020s comedy horror films
Spanish comedy horror films